Arnold Zweig (10 November 1887 – 26 November 1968) was a German writer, pacifist and socialist. 
He is best known for his six-part cycle on World War I.

Life and work
Zweig was born in Glogau, Prussian Silesia (now Głogów, Poland), the son of a Jewish saddler. (He is not related to Stefan Zweig.) After attending a gymnasium in Kattowitz (Katowice), he made extensive studies in history, philosophy and literature at several universities – Breslau (Wrocław), Munich, Berlin, Göttingen, Rostock and Tübingen. He was especially influenced by Friedrich Nietzsche's philosophy. His first literary works, Novellen um Claudia (1913) and Ritualmord in Ungarn, gained him wider recognition.

Zweig volunteered for the German army in World War I and saw action as a private in France, Hungary and Serbia. He was stationed in the Western Front at the time when Judenzählung (the Jewish census) was administered in the German army. Shaken by the experience, he wrote in his letter dated 15 February 1917, to Martin Buber: "The Judenzählung was a reflection of unheard sadness for Germany's sin and our agony. ... If there was no antisemitism in the army, the unbearable call to duty would be almost easy."  He began to revise his views on the war and came to view the war as one that pitted Jews against Jews.  Later he described his experiences in the short story Judenzählung vor Verdun. The war changed Zweig from a Prussian patriot to an eager pacifist.

By the end of the war he was assigned to the Press department of the German Army Headquarters in Kaunas and there he was first introduced to the East European Jewish organizations.

In a quite literal effort to put a face to the hated 'Ostjude' (Eastern European Jew), due to their Orthodox, economically depressed, "unenlightened", "un-German" ways, Zweig published with the artist Hermann Struck Das ostjüdische Antlitz (The Face of East European Jewry) in 1920. This was a blatant effort to at least gain sympathy among German-speaking Jews for the plight of their eastern European brethren. With the help of many simple sketches of faces, Zweig supplied interpretations and meaning behind them.

After World War I he was an active socialistic Zionist in Germany. After Hitler's attempted coup in 1923 Zweig went to Berlin and worked as an editor of a newspaper, the Jüdische Rundschau.

In the 1920s, Zweig became attracted to the psychoanalytical theories of Sigmund Freud and underwent Freudian therapy himself. In March 1927 Zweig wrote to Freud asking permission to dedicate his new book to Freud. In the letter Zweig told Freud: "I personally owe to your psychological therapy the restoration of my whole personality, the discovery that I was suffering from a neurosis and finally the curing of this neurosis by your method of treatment."

Freud returned this ardent letter with a warm letter of his own, and the Freud-Zweig correspondence continued for a dozen years – momentous years in Germany's history. This correspondence is extensive and interesting enough to have been published in book form.

In 1927 Zweig published the anti-war novel The Case of Sergeant Grischa, which made him an international literary figure. The theme of his sequence of World War I fiction is that Germany was perverted by brutal men who shifted the purpose of the war from defense to conquest.  Major contestants in this struggle are characters in his books.  Some, like Kaiser Wilhelm II, Field Marshal von Hindenburg, and  commander on the Eastern Front during the last two years of the war Prince Leopold of Bavaria, are named.  Others are masked, but would have been easily identified by many readers at the time:  for example, General Ludendorff is  "Schieffenzahn", the politician Matthias Erzberger is "Deputy Hemmerle", General Max Hoffmann is "Clauss", and Field Marshal von Eichorn  is "von Lychow".

From 1929 he was a contributing journalist of socialist newspaper Die Weltbühne (World Stage). That year, Zweig would attend one of Hitler's speeches. He told his wife that the man was a Charlie Chaplin without the talent.  In 1933, Zweig witnessed the destruction of his books in the Nazi book burning. He remarked that the crowds "would have stared as happily into the flames if live humans were burning."  He decided to leave Germany that night.

Exile in Palestine
When the Nazi Party took power in Germany in 1933, Zweig was one of many Jews who immediately went into voluntary exile. Zweig went first to Czechoslovakia, then Switzerland and France. After spending some time with Thomas Mann, Lion Feuchtwanger, Anna Seghers and Bertolt Brecht in France, he set out for Mandatory Palestine, then under British rule.

In Haifa, Palestine, he published a German-language newspaper, the Orient. In Palestine, Zweig became close to a group of German-speaking immigrants who felt distant from Zionism and viewed themselves as refugees or exiles from Europe, where they planned to return. This group included Max Brod, Else Lasker-Schüler and Wolfgang Hildesheimer. During his years in Palestine, Zweig became disillusioned with Zionism and turned to socialism.

In Haifa, Zweig underwent psychoanalysis with Ilya Schalit. His novels De Vriendt Goes Home and A Costly Dream are partly set in Mandatory Palestine and describe, among other things, the encounter between Zionism, socialism and psychoanalysis. In De Vriendt Goes Home, a young Zionist, recently immigrated to Palestine from Eastern Europe, kills the Dutch Jew De Vriendt who, on the basis of a more orthodox religious sentiment, was seeking an understanding with the local Arab population. During his stay in Palestine, Zweig may have been the main link between Freud and the local psychoanalytic community.

His 1947 book  concerned the Altona Bloody Sunday (Altonaer Blutsonntag) riot, an SA march on 17 July 1932 that turned violent and led to 18 people being shot dead, with four Communists including Bruno Tesch subsequently being beheaded for their alleged involvement.

East Germany
In 1948, after a formal invitation from the East German authorities, Zweig decided to return to the Soviet occupation zone in Germany (which became East Germany in 1949). In East Germany he was in many ways involved in the communist system. He was a member of parliament, delegate to the World Peace Council Congresses and the cultural advisory board of the communist party. He was President of the DDR Academy of Arts, Berlin from 1950 to 1953.

He was rewarded with many prizes and medals by the regime. The USSR awarded him the Lenin Peace Prize (1958) for his anti-war novels. He was nominated for the Nobel Prize in Literature seven times.

After 1962, due to poor health, Zweig virtually withdrew from the political and artistic fields. Arnold Zweig died in East Berlin on 26 November 1968, aged 81.

Bibliography
 .
 Ritualmord in Ungarn (Ritual Murder in Hungary), 1914
 .
Playthings of Time
 Der große Krieg der weißen Männer [The Great War of the White Men] - a cycle in six parts
 .
 .
 .
 .
 .
 .
 .
 .     
 .
 .
 .

Film adaptations
 The Case of Sergeant Grischa (1930), US film directed by Herbert Brenon. This film is presumed lost, as no negative or print material is known to have survived.
 The Axe of Wandsbek (1951), directed by Falk Harnack, produced in East Germany
 Der Streit um den Sergeanten Grischa (1968), directed by Helmut Schiemann as a TV film in two parts for the East German broadcaster Deutscher Fernsehfunk
  (1970), East German film directed by Egon Günther
 Erziehung vor Verdun (1973), East German film directed by Egon Günther
  (1982), a West German TV film docudrama directed by Heinrich Breloer and

See also

 List of peace activists

References

Further reading

 .
 .
 Cohen, Robert, "Arnold Zweig's War Novellas of 1914 and their Versions: Literature, Modernity, and the Demands of the Day." War, Violence and the Modern Condition. Bernd Hüppauf (ed.). De Gruyter, 1997. 277–289.
 .

External links 

 

1887 births
1968 deaths
People from Głogów
People from the Province of Silesia
Cultural Association of the GDR members
Members of the Provisional Volkskammer
Members of the 1st Volkskammer
Members of the 2nd Volkskammer
Members of the 3rd Volkskammer
Members of the 4th Volkskammer
East German writers
20th-century German novelists
German male novelists
German newspaper editors
German anti-war activists
Jewish novelists
German Zionists
Jewish socialists
Jewish German writers
German Jewish military personnel of World War I
Jewish emigrants from Nazi Germany to Mandatory Palestine
Exilliteratur writers
Recipients of the National Prize of East Germany
Kleist Prize winners
Recipients of the Patriotic Order of Merit (honor clasp)
Lenin Peace Prize recipients